Thousand Eyes may refer to:

 ThousandEyes, an American network intelligence company
 "Thousand Eyes", a song by FKA Twigs from Magdalene
 "Thousand Eyes", a song by Lia Ices from Ices
 "Thousand Eyes", a song by Of Monsters and Men from Beneath the Skin
 Thousand Eyes, a Japanese melodic death metal band

See also